Donda 2 is a  demo album by American rapper Kanye West. Although unfinished, it was exclusively released on the Stem Player, with four songs made available on February 23, 2022, and additional songs later included in updates, the first of which were added the following day. West began the recording and production of the album in early January 2022, continuing into the next month. It was preceded by the singles "Eazy" and "City of Gods", released in January and February 2022, respectively; both of them charted inside the top 50 of the US Billboard Hot 100.

West held "Kanye West: Donda Experience Performance", an accompanying performance, showcasing songs from the first iteration, at LoanDepot Park on February 22, 2022, selling out 47 IMAX theaters across the United States. The "V2.22.22 Miami" version of the album received mixed reviews from music critics, who criticized its subject matter, song structures, and lack of identifiable concept. Some were more negative towards West's vocals, though a few critics complimented certain elements of the production. Because of its exclusive Stem Player release, the album was heavily pirated in February 2022 with emulators of the device shared online, and Billboard deemed the album ineligible for its albums charts citing precedented "bundling" rules; the album did not debut on other record charts of the world either.

Despite the expectation that the album would eventually be updated and completed, the project saw no further major updates throughout the rest of 2022, and in light of West's antisemitic remarks, the Stem player's parent company Kano Computing cut ties with West and discontinued the Donda Stem Player. As a result, the album is not currently available for purchase or streaming.

Background and recording
In an interview with Complex on January 3, 2022, Victor Victor Worldwide CEO Steven Victor exclusively told the website that West had begun working on a sequel to his tenth studio album Donda (2021), entitled Donda 2. Victor later told the magazine that it is "coming sooner than you think", explaining: "The procession is starting and it's not stopping." On January 27, 2022, West captioned an Instagram photo of his childhood home in flames with a date of February 22 along with the title Donda 2, also mentioning fellow rapper Future will serve the role of executive producer. He had worked with Future in the past, featuring on his single "I Won" (2014). Most publications took this as an announcement of the album's release date, though it went unreleased on the date. Producer BoogzDaBeast revealed that even though hundreds of songs were recorded during the sessions for the first Donda album, the tracks recorded for Donda 2 were all new songs made after the announcement of the Donda 2 listening event.

Producer Digital Nas revealed that for Donda 2, West instructed him to make the songs sound "more monk-like" and to "simplify the tracks", and if they are "not able to be played at a funeral, childbirth, graduation, a wedding", then inclusion on the album is not appropriate. In late January 2022, the producer stated that singer Marilyn Manson was recording for Donda 2 daily in the studio. Marilyn Manson had previously contributed to Donda and for the sequel, Digital Nas opened up that West does not want the singer to "play rap beats", desiring for him "to play what he makes" and then West would work on parts of his work. Digital Nas compared the creative process to that of West's sixth studio album Yeezus (2013), also saying that some of the producers who contributed to the album were working on Donda 2.

He explained that his motive is how artists "get just 12% of the money the industry makes" when their music is available on the platforms, calling for a time for freedom from "this oppressive system". According to West, he made around $2.2 million from purchases of the Stem Player within 24 hours of the announcement, having sold over 8,000 copies. However, West making the album only available on the device led to criticism from his fans. As a result of the rapper's decision, Apple reportedly pulled their $2 million sponsorship deal with him, as they were scheduled to stream the accompanying concert. In a series of Instagram posts, West declared that he had turned down a $100 million deal with the company. The first batch of songs that were played at the Miami listening event on February 22, 2022–which were added to the device on February 24–contained half-mumbled reference tracks and incomplete songs; West continued finishing the album during February. The co-inventor of the Stem Player tweeted that official Donda 2 songs are available and always updated via the device, adding that "anywhere else, you're not getting the vision or the latest versions", insinuating that West plans to update the album as he had done previously with The Life of Pablo and Donda in 2016 and 2021, respectively.

Music and themes
Donda 2 is a hip hop album. The album was described in multiple reviews as seeming unfinished, with Alphonse Pierre, writing for Pitchfork, viewing it as a "undercooked" album posing as an "ever-changing art piece" that may remain incomplete. A production style that incorporates "see-sawing synth patterns" was observed by The Guardian journalist Alexis Petridis in his review of the album, who also commented that there is a lack of focus, seeing certain songs as resembling demos. According to HipHopDX writer Matthew Ritchie, large stretches of the production demonstrate West's "attention to detail" that creates a background for songs.

West delves into relationship problems between himself and Kim Kardashian on Donda 2, particularly discussing their divorce. Thematically, this topic drew comparisons to West's fourth studio album 808s & Heartbreak (2008) from numerous writers. He goes into detail about the divorce, focusing on his many emotions and insecurities. West directs insults towards comedian Pete Davidson, who became Kardashian's new partner. West also addresses his family's concerns, disregarding them. The rapper conveys a bitter and self-pitying style, seeking the sympathy of others, while showing a lack of both happiness and empathy.

Songs

The album's opening track, "True Love", contains a drum break shared with West's 2010 single "Runaway" that samples "The Basement" by Pete Rock & CL Smooth. A posthumous feature from rapper XXXTentacion is included at the beginning, singing about lost love. On the track, West laments the childcare arrangements brought about in the wake of his divorce. West also references XXXTentacion's son Geykume during the second chorus, as he reminds both his and the late rapper's children of their respective fathers' love for them. "Broken Road" is a ballad featuring rapper Don Toliver, in which West delivers introspection and declares his freedom. "Get Lost" sees West singing a cappella with Auto-Tune heavily applied to his voice, recalling varying memories of his marriage to Kardashian. "Too Easy" features electronic elements and contains a mantra by West, who uses the vocal technique as he champions self love. The rapper references his then-budding relationship with actress Julia Fox on "Flowers" and alludes to both his birthday gift for her and his Valentine's Day present for his ex-wife Kim Kardashian. On June 29, 2022, West was sued by Marshall Jefferson for allegedly sampling his song "Move Your Body" without permission in "Flowers".  West angrily threatens to fight Davidson on the noisy and aggressive track "Security", proclaiming that he "ain't got enough security for this".

"We Did It Kid" includes guest vocals from Baby Keem, and the Migos and features lyrics about friendship over a brass trap beat. "Pablo" is an energetic track with a fast-moving beat and a hook from fellow rapper Travis Scott, while Future also contributes a verse. "Louie Bags" is a tribute to designer Virgil Abloh, a friend of West's. West states on the minimally-produced electronic-backed track that he stopped buying Abloh's Louis Vuitton bags after his death in 2021. The track ends with a verse performed by Jack Harlow. "Happy" opens with a verse from Future, preceding three verses from West, who conveys his sadness as he repeatedly pleads: "Do I look happy to you?" "Sci Fi" features lush orchestral production and begins with a monologue from Kardashian's 2021 appearance on Saturday Night Live, in which she applauds West's achievements. Lyrically, West tells the story of their divorce. "Selfish" is a minimal ballad that posthumously features XXXTentacion, with West analyzing how his flaws led to the divorce. "Lord Lift Me Up" has an orchestral style and consists solely of vocals from Vory. "City of Gods" is a Brooklyn drill styled track serves as an ode to New York City from West, fellow rapper Fivio Foreign, and singer Alicia Keys. "First Time in a Long Time" embraces new beginnings and features a guest verse from Soulja Boy. On West and fellow rapper the Game's collaboration "Eazy", the former disses Davidson, threatening to "beat [his] ass."

The song "Mr. Miyagi", featuring Future and Playboi Carti, was played at the Donda 2 listening event, but has yet to be officially released. It leaked online in November 2022.

Promotion and release

On January 15, 2022, "Eazy" was made available as a Spotify exclusive, one day before it was released as the first single from Donda 2. The song entered the US Billboard Hot 100 at number 49, alongside peaking at number 32 on the UK Singles Chart. A music video for "Eazy" was released on March 3, 2022, featuring West kidnapping a clay-version of Davidson that he goes on to bury. On February 11, "City of Gods" was released as the second single from the album. The song charted at number 46 on the Hot 100, while it reached number 58 on the UK Singles Chart. On May 27, 2022, the song "True Love" got an official release on streaming services. It was also included on XXXTentacion's "Look At Me: The Album". The song peaked on the Billboard Hot 100 upon its debut at number 22, and on the Hot Hip-Hop/R&B chart at number 5. On March 8, 2022, alongside an update to the Stem Player website that allowed users who'd purchased the Stem Player to stream songs from Donda 2 without having to connect their Stem Player devices to their computers (thereby allowing music to be streamed from the site like a traditional music streaming service), the songs Pablo and Security were made available to stream for all (even those without a Stem Player), likely as additional singles for Donda 2, with these versions having updated mixes. These free versions of both songs were later taken down from the site, with the only streamable versions of the songs remaining the ones that could be streamed with the rest of the album.

A total of 22 songs were announced via a track list for Donda 2 posted by West to his Instagram account on February 18, 2022. On February 23, four songs, entitled "Security", "Pablo", "Broken Road", and "We Did It Kid", were released to owners of the Stem Player via the player's website. Another 12 songs were added the following day as part of an update labeled "V2.22.22 Miami". However, one of the 12 additional songs released, entitled "Keep It Burning", was removed from the Stem Player website and replaced with a stadium version of "True Love", which was then later replaced with "Eazy". A finished version of the song "Keep It Burning" would instead later be released on Future's album, I Never Liked You.

Donda 2 leaked online shortly after release and was heavily pirated. The album was one of the most pirated albums on 1337x and the Pirate Bay in February 2022. It also led to the piracy of the Stem Player website, since the song stems and remixing tools were available on emulators. Donda 2 is not eligible to enter any Billboard charts per the rules on releases sold with merchandise, as it is exclusive to the Stem Player service. During his performance at Rolling Loud music festival in July 2022, Digital Nas suggested that a finished version of the album would be released later that year.

In January 2023, in light of West’s antisemitic remarks, Kano Computing, the manufacturer of the Stem Player, announced that their collaboration with West has ended, and that the Donda Stem Player would be discontinued after they sold through the remaining stock of 5,000 units. At the same time, Kano announced a new variant of the Stem Player developed in collaboration with Ghostface Killah that would not include Donda 2 or any other content from West.

Events

On February 7, 2022, a private listening party was held for Donda 2 at Nobu Malibu, where Travis Scott and fellow rappers Offset, French Montana, Yung Lean, and Drake, as well as model Kendall Jenner, were in attendance. Six days later, West announced a public concert entitled "Kanye West: Donda Experience Performance" for the album at LoanDepot Park in Miami on February 22. Tickets for the concert were first made available on February 14, 2022, six days before ones for IMAX presentations went on sale. On February 21, 2022, it was announced that the concert would be live-streamed in IMAX theaters across 15 cities in the United States at 9p.m. ET. In response to popular demand, IMAX subsequently expanded the live-stream to 60 theaters across the US for the one-night only event on February 22. Simultaneously with the screening, the event was live-streamed on YouTube and West's Stem Player service. It sold out 47 of the 60 theaters, grossing around $313,582 for IMAX. The performance was set to begin at 8p.m. ET, though started nearly 3 hours late at 10:45 p.m. West was joined by numerous guests, such as Marilyn Manson and DaBaby–both of whom appeared at the first listening event for Donda–as well as Fivio Foreign, Keys, and Jack Harlow. Celebrities in attendance included French Montana, Elon Musk, and Diddy. West experienced multiple microphone problems and audio glitches while performing, to which he reacted during a performance of "Jail pt 2" by throwing his microphone on the floor. The rapper later revealed to Sasha A. Berg and Esther Coco Berg that he had been made "to write the word 'performance'" in the event's title, despite intending the event as a work of performance art. His frustration with this reduction of the event's concept led alongside other reactions to him throwing the microphone he was given, saying he began questioning why he was performing.

Critical reception

The "V2.22.22 Miami" version of Donda 2 was met with generally mixed reviews with critics describing the album as unfinished and lazy compared to West's previous releases.

Jeff Ihaza of Rolling Stone called the album a "confounding" project that is brought down by West's fixation on "controlling one's narrative", deriding the lyrical content, guest appearances, and the lack of a clear concept, despite praising certain vocals. Slates Jack Hamilton wrote off its "aimless" song structures and "fake-deep" lyricism, also feeling let down by the "half-hearted" production that has its best-inspired moments "drowned in a sea of repetitive, spaced-out bloat". Ludovic Hunter-Tilney, writing in the Financial Times, found Donda 2 "repetitious and lacklustre", disclosing "serious deficiencies" in West's creativity, but picked "Security" as a highlight. Reviewing the album for The Guardian, Alexis Petridis disapproved of its lack of thematic focus, unfinished production and the lyrical content for its "tedious barbs at his estranged wife", but admitted some portions briefly showed "the authentically brilliant producer" West is capable of being.

The Daily Telegraph critic Neil McCormick regarded Donda 2 as the weakest album of West's career, seeing West assume a "sullen, self-pitying and bitter" persona—"vindictive sniping and whiney self-pity". McCormick criticized the album's song structures and repetitive rhymes, as well as the auto-tuned vocals, even though he liked some of the accompanying beats. Underscoring its "sluggish" energy and "undermining" production, Steven Loftin from The Line of Best Fit felt the album is "nothing particularly revelatory", discussing the expected, repetitive themes, though moderately gave credit to the production. Pitchfork Alphonse Pierre defined Donda 2 as a "crudely unfinished dump of songs" camouflaged by the Stem Player's technological spectacle. He described the songs as "lackluster" and "undercooked", displaying "a cool moment or two" but mostly amorphous.

Few reviews were marginally favorable. Alexandra Pauly of Highsnobiety wrote lukewarm comments, describing the album as a divorce record that "boasts all the hallmarks" of an artist experiencing "post-nuptial proceedings". Pauly was dissatisfied with how Donda 2 lacks the sincerity exuded by other divorce albums, saying it "reeks of [the] ego" that appeals to West's fan base. Ritchie of HipHopDX opined that West's hyper-focus on his current drama has resulted in Donda 2, "a double-edged sword"—musically cohesive but with underdeveloped ideas.

Commercial performance 
Donda 2 was not eligible for entry on the Billboard charts, such as the Billboard 200, since "it is not available apart from the purchase of one of [West's] $200-plus Stem Player devices." Billboard asserted on March 4, 2022, that attaching a new album to a physical device counts as "bundling"—a practice the organization deemed invalid in 2020 and implemented a rule to disregard such tactics from being counted as record sales. West celebrated the album's expulsion from the charts via his Instagram account, writing "Big win for the kid. We can no longer be counted or judged. We make my own systems. We set our own value aaaand [sic] yesterday's price is not todays price baaaaabeeeee [sic] !!!!!".

Stem Player sales within the first 24 hours of the album's release have been estimated at around 11,000 units, which would place the album's gross revenue at $2.2 million. Ye claimed that the total revenue for the album within the first 24 hours amounted to $1.3 million. Variety journalist Chris Willman reported that West has sold 39,500 Stem Players as of February 18, 2022, according to the rapper's claims. Willman noted that the player has been available since October 2021.

Track listing

Track listing according to Stem Player API. Credits for "True Love", "City of Gods" and "Eazy" are adapted from Tidal.

  signifies a co-producer
  signifies an additional producer

Uncredited features
 "True Love" and "Selfish" feature vocals by XXXTentacion.
 "Broken Road" features vocals by Don Toliver.
 "We Did It Kid" features vocals by Baby Keem and Migos.
 "Pablo" features vocals by Future and Travis Scott.
 "Louie Bags" features vocals by Jack Harlow.
 "Happy" features vocals by Future. 
 "Sci Fi" features vocals by Sean Leon. 
 "Lord Lift Me Up" features vocals by Vory. 
 "City of Gods" features vocals by Alicia Keys, Fivio Foreign and Playboi Carti.
 "First Time in a Long Time" features vocals by Soulja Boy.
 "Eazy" features vocals by the Game.

Samples
 "Security" samples "Wanna Trap" by Mica Levi.
 "Louie Bags" features an excerpt of a telephone call made by Kamala Harris.
 "Sci Fi" features an excerpt of a monologue by Kim Kardashian from Saturday Night Live.
 "Eazy" samples "Eazy-Duz-It" by Eazy-E.

Notes
Notes

References

2022 albums
Kanye West albums
Albums in memory of deceased persons
Albums produced by Kanye West
Self-released albums
Sequel albums
Unfinished albums